Beaver Creek is an unincorporated community in eastern Washington County, Maryland, United States. Its population was 251 as of the 2010 census. The community is officially included in the Hagerstown Metropolitan Area (Hagerstown-Martinsburg, MD-WV Metropolitan Statistical Area). This town was founded in 1766.

Although Beaver Creek is home to several historic landmarks such as Beaver Creek School and the Doub's Mill Historic District, most of the community's development has occurred since the 1990s, with new and upscale housing for professionals from Hagerstown and from the Washington, D.C. Metro area.

The area is known for its picturesque countryside with rolling hills and a backdrop of South Mountain.

Demographics

Gallery

References

Unincorporated communities in Washington County, Maryland
Unincorporated communities in Maryland